Canute is an anglicisation of the Scandinavian name Knut. It may refer to:

Medieval era:
Cnut the Great (c. 995–1035), also known as Canute, King of Denmark, England and Norway
Harthacnut or Canute III (c. 1018–1042), King of Denmark and England, son of Cnut the Great
Canute I of Sweden (before 1150–1195/96), King of Sweden
Canute II of Sweden (died 1234), King of Sweden
Canute IV of Denmark (c. 1042–1086), King of Denmark and Roman Catholic saint
Canute V of Denmark (c. 1129–1157), King of Denmark
Canute VI of Denmark (1163–1202), King of Denmark
Canute, Duke of Estonia (1205–1260), bastard son of Valdemar II of Denmark
Canute Lavard (1096–1131), a Danish prince, first Duke of Schleswig and Roman Catholic saint
Canute or Knud Porse (died 1330), Danish Duke of Samsø, Duke of Halland and Duke of Estonia
Canute Mikkelsen, Roman Catholic Bishop of Viborg from 1451 to 1478

Modern world:
Canute Anderson (1830–1893), American politician, a member of the Wisconsin State Assembly
Canute Caliste (1914–2005), a naive painter from Grenada
Canute Curtis (born 1974), former National Football League player
Canute R. Matson (1843–1903), Sheriff of Cook County, Illinois
Canute Peterson (1824–1902), Mormon pioneer and church leader

See also
Yakima Canutt (1895–1986), American champion rodeo rider, actor, stuntman and action director

Masculine given names
English masculine given names